Sheikh Faleh bin Nasser bin Ahmed bin Ali Al Thani is the Qatari Minister of Environment and Climate Change. He was appointed as minister on 19 October 2021.

Education 
Sheikh Faleh holds PhDs in Water Resources Management and Solar Water Desalination from the University of Hertfordshire in the United Kingdom.

References 

Living people
Government ministers of Qatar
21st-century Qatari politicians
Qatari politicians
Year of birth missing (living people)

Alumni of the University of Hertfordshire